KIL is a 2013 Malaysian mystery drama film directed by Nik Amir Mustapha and It was written by Nik Amir Mustapha, Rewan Ishak and Khairulzaman Dzulkifly and produced by Tengku Iesta Tengku Alaudin.

The film's title, a play on the word "kill" and "Akil", the latter being the name of the main protagonist – a quiet and depressed young man who sees suicide as his only solution. After several suicide attempts, Akil hires an agency known as Life Action Bureau (LAB), to help him commit suicide. When the date of his death draws near, he falls in love with a girl he met, Zara. This interaction however causes him to begin having second thoughts about death.

The film stars Redza Minhat and Cristina Suzanne. The film had a public release on 30 May 2013.

The film won four awards from seven nominations at the Anugerah Skrin 2013 (including Best Film) and topped the 26th Malaysian Film Festival with five wins out of eleven nominations (including Best Picture).

Plot
A young, depressed man named Akil (Redza Minhat) wants to commit suicide. However, he always fails in each attempt. When attempting to jump from the building, he manages to prevent a teenager (Juliana Evans) from committing suicide because of a break-up.

One day, he notices a flyer that promotes suicide services. Akil calls the number and speaks to Salina (Dira Abu Zahar) and discovers an agency named Life Action Bureau (LAB). After discussing with the LAB consultant, Mr. Harun (Harun Salim Bachik), he hires the agency to kill him in an unknown manner. He does not know who the LAB contractors (assassins) are or when and where the execution will take place.

Akil resumes his normal life until he begins to fall in love with a girl he meets, Zara (Cristina Suzanne). Akil frequently meets with Zara before he realises he was being followed by a LAB contractor. Akil then gets his first bonus (after four years of work) from his boss. Akil brings Zara to watch a movie titled World Without Tomorrow, directed by Johan Iskandar (Hasnul Rahmat). Johan is one of LAB's customers due to his failed marriage with his wife (Atilia Haron).

As the day passes, Akil receives photos of his everyday life with little notes on them encouraging him to continue living. Akil becomes happier with his life. Zara is later revealed as the LAB contractor for Johan. The next day, Akil is kidnapped and gets photographed before being released. Akil then arrives home and finds his house ransacked. Frustrated, Akil calls LAB officials to cancel his contract. After Mr. Harun says the cancellation is impossible, Akil tries to make a police report but struggles to explain the situation to the police.

Akil then returns to the village to meet with his Aunt Rose. His mother had been killed in an accident due to Akil's mistake. Zara is revealed to have received kidneys from Raj, the son of Miss Jasmine (Anna James). After returning from the village, Akil comes across a collection of photos of Zara's victims.

After that, Akil meets with Zara. Zara tells him that she is working with LAB but denies she is a killer. They argue for a moment before Akil tells Zara to kill him straight away. Zara slaps Akil and reminds him that she still cares about him. Upon returning home, Akil meets with the LAB contractor assigned to kill him (Mr. Harun). Akil says he wants his life back before Mr. Harun shoots him.

Zara tries to find information on Akil's case in the LAB data library but it is too late to prevent Mr. Harun from executing the contract.

In the epilogue, the pistol is revealed to be a toy gun. LAB is not a killing agency but is a NGO that aims to prevent suicide. Knowing that he or she would be killed, one would better appreciate life. Mr. Harun says that Zara is a LAB contractor but is not working for him. The film ends with Zara giving a treat to Akil for being able to guess her exact job.

Cast
 Redza Minhat as Akil
 Cristina Suzanne as Zara
 Harun Salim Bachik as Encik Harun
 Juliana Evans as Suicide Girl
 Hasnul Rahmat as Johan Iskandar
 Anne James as Miss Jasmine
 Dira Abu Zahar as Salina
 Atilia Haron as Johan wife
 Ella as Neighbour

Accolades

References

External links
 
 
 
 

2013 films
Malaysian drama films
Films about suicide